Metazuphium spinangulus is a species of beetle in the family Carabidae, the only species in the genus Metazuphium.

References

Dryptinae